The Gooding Milner canal is an irrigation canal that runs through the Magic Valley (in Idaho, United States) providing water to nearby farms. It starts 8 miles west of Burley, at  the Milner Dam and runs pastEden, Hazelton, Dietrich, Shoshone and Bliss before emptying into the Big Wood River in Gooding.

The Little Wood River is a tributary with several small ditches as well. The canal also serves as a favorite recreation area for people that enjoy tubing in tires as well and floating down the canal.

Referneces

External links

Buildings and structures in Minidoka County, Idaho
Buildings and structures in Jerome County, Idaho
Buildings and structures in Lincoln County, Idaho
Buildings and structures in Gooding County, Idaho
Canals in Idaho